Zarinsky (masculine), Zarinskaya (feminine), or Zarinskoye (neuter) may refer to:
Zarinsky District, a district of Altai Krai, Russia
Zarinskoye, a rural locality (a selo) in Kemerovo Oblast, Russia
Robert Zarinsky (1940–2008), convicted murderer and suspected serial killer from New Jersey, USA